The Shetland Islands Broadcasting Company (SIBC) is a local independent commercial radio station broadcasting in the Shetland Islands. The station, which is owned and operated by husband and wife team, Ian Anderson and Inga Walterson, is located at Market Street, Lerwick and broadcasts from Bressay on 96.2 MHz FM (also on 102.2 MHz in Lerwick).

History
The company, which was registered on 23 September 1985 and has Ofcom licence number AL131-2, began broadcasting on 26 November 1987. It is currently on a 5-year licence. The shorter-term licence was issued when there was a belief by the regulator Ofcom that analogue (FM) broadcasting was coming to an end and it did not want to license current FM stations beyond the changeover date to digital.

Ian Anderson, the station's main owner, was previously a broadcaster for the BBC and Radio Forth, as well as pirate radio stations including Radio Atlantis, Radio Northsea International, and Radio Caroline.

Programming
SIBC is on the air 24 hours a day, seven days a week, with a schedule of contemporary music and news with a local emphasis. News bulletins – with the latest local news and weather, together with some national, Nordic, and world reports – are broadcast every hour on the hour from 6.00 on Mondays to 18.00 on Saturdays and from 6.00 to 18.00 on Sundays, with additional bulletins at 6.30, 7.30, and 8.30 on Mondays to Saturdays and at 17.30 on Mondays to Fridays. The station also carries, as necessary, essential information regarding emergencies, school closures, etc.

References

External links
SIBC Web site
SIBC on Twitter

Radio stations established in 1985
Radio stations in Scotland
Shetland music
Mass media in Shetland
Companies based in Shetland
1985 establishments in Scotland